The National Garden of American Heroes was a sculpture garden honoring "great figures of America's history" that was proposed by President Donald Trump in executive orders on July 3, 2020, and January 18, 2021. Trump first announced the idea at an Independence Day event at Mount Rushmore in Keystone, South Dakota. The sculpture garden idea was part of a series of executive orders issued by Trump  in his final months in office to address conservative cultural grievances; the second of the two executive orders was issued two days before Trump's term expired. Congress never appropriated funding for such a garden, nor were concrete steps ever taken to construct such a site. President Joe Biden revoked the executive orders relating to the garden in May 2021.

Trump's vision for the garden included statues of notable Founding Fathers, activists, political figures, businesspeople, athletes, celebrities, and pop culture icons. The premise of the proposal and the selection of statues to be erected was questioned by historians and scholars, who described it as random and scattershot.

Trump executive orders 
Trump's order said that the proposed garden would be managed by the Task Force for Building and Rebuilding Monuments to American Heroes, which would allocate funding from the Interior Department to establish the site. Members of the task force would include chairs of the National Endowment for the Arts and National Endowment for the Humanities, the Administrator of General Services, the chair of the Advisory Council on Historic Preservation, and any additional "officers or employees of any executive department or agency" designated by the president. Trump described the garden as a response to the practice of removing monuments and memorials to Confederate figures and others; many such monuments were removed or destroyed in 2020 as part of a response to the George Floyd protests. In his Mount Rushmore speech announcing the proposal, Trump claimed that "Angry mobs are trying to tear down statues of our founders, deface our most sacred memorials and unleash a wave of violent crime in our cities" and pledged to build "a vast outdoor park that will feature the statues of the greatest Americans to ever live."

Under Trump's Executive Order 13934, issued July 3, 2020, the task force was granted 60 days to develop preliminary plans for the site, including a potential location, and was to open before July 4, 2026, the 250th anniversary of the adoption of the Declaration of Independence. 

The original executive order listed 31 historical figures as examples of those who would receive a statue in the Garden. On January 18, 2021—two days before leaving office—Trump signed a new executive order (Executive Order 13978) listing 244 historical figures, including all 31 previously named, of those who would receive statues. The revised list included 192 men and 52 women.

Reception by historians
Historians questioned the scattershot nature of Trump's proposal; James R. Grossman, the executive director of the American Historical Association, said that "The choices vary from odd to probably inappropriate to provocative" and suggested that the proposal was an attempt by Trump "to seize on a cultural conflict to distract from other issues" during an election season, as suggested by the short (60-day) timetable that Trump set forth in his order. Historian Karen Cox described the executive order about the proposed monument as "random" and said that "Nothing about this suggests it's thoughtful." Historian Adam Domby noted Trump's initial list included no Native Americans, and included George Patton but omitted Dwight D. Eisenhower.

The premise of Trump's proposal was criticized by historian Michael Beschloss, who wrote that "No president of the United States or federal government has any business dictating to citizens who our historical heroes should be. This is not Stalin's Russia. Any American who loves democracy should make sure there is never some official, totalitarian-sounding 'National Garden of American Heroes,' with names forced upon us by the federal government."

Revocation of executive orders
The garden was considered highly unlikely to be built, and Congress never appropriated any funds for the project. On May 14, 2021, President Biden issued an executive order that revoked both of Trump's executive orders on the Garden, as well as various other Trump-issued executive orders.

Proposed statues
The original executive order listed 31 historical figures as examples of those who would receive a statue in the Garden. On January 18, 2021—two days before leaving office—Trump signed a new executive order listing 244 historical figures, including all 31 previously named, of those who would receive statues. The revised list included 192 men and 52 women. Names marked with an asterisk (*) were included in the original executive order.

Ansel Adams
Samuel Adams
John Adams*
Muhammad Ali
Luis Walter Alvarez
Susan B. Anthony*
Hannah Arendt
Louis Armstrong
Neil Armstrong
Crispus Attucks
John James Audubon
Lauren Bacall
Clara Barton*
Todd Beamer
Alexander Graham Bell
Roy Benavidez
Ingrid Bergman
Irving Berlin
Humphrey Bogart
Daniel Boone*
Norman Borlaug
William Bradford
Herb Brooks
Kobe Bryant
William F. Buckley Jr.
Sitting Bull
Frank Capra
Andrew Carnegie
Charles Carroll
John Carroll
George Washington Carver
Johnny Cash
Joseph H. De Castro
Joshua Chamberlain*
Whittaker Chambers
Johnny "Appleseed" Chapman
Ray Charles
Julia Child
Gordon Chung-Hoon
William Clark
Henry Clay*
Roberto Clemente
Grover Cleveland
Red Cloud
William F. "Buffalo Bill" Cody
Nat King Cole
Samuel Colt
Christopher Columbus
Calvin Coolidge
James Fenimore Cooper
Davy Crockett*
Benjamin O. Davis Jr.
Miles Davis
Dorothy Day
Emily Dickinson
Walt Disney
William J. Donovan
Jimmy Doolittle
Desmond Doss
Frederick Douglass*
Herbert Henry Dow
Katharine Drexel
Peter Drucker
Amelia Earhart*
Thomas Edison
Jonathan Edwards
Albert Einstein
Dwight D. Eisenhower
Duke Ellington
Ralph Waldo Emerson
Medgar Evers
David Farragut
Mary Fields
Henry Ford
George L. Fox
Aretha Franklin
Benjamin Franklin*
Milton Friedman
Robert Frost
Gabby Gabreski
Bernardo de Gálvez
Lou Gehrig
Theodor Seuss Geisel
Cass Gilbert
Ruth Bader Ginsburg
John Glenn
Barry Goldwater
Samuel Gompers
Alexander D. Goode
R. C. Gorman
Billy Graham*
Ulysses S. Grant
Nellie Gray
Nathanael Greene
Woody Guthrie
Nathan Hale
William Halsey Jr.
Alexander Hamilton*
Ira Hayes
Hans Christian Heg
Ernest Hemingway
Patrick Henry
Charlton Heston
Alfred Hitchcock
Billie Holiday
Bob Hope
Johns Hopkins
Grace Hopper
Sam Houston
Whitney Houston
Julia Ward Howe
Edwin Hubble
Daniel Inouye
Andrew Jackson
Robert H. Jackson
Mary Jackson
John Jay
Thomas Jefferson*
Steve Jobs
Katherine Johnson
Barbara Jordan
Chief Joseph
Elia Kazan
Helen Keller
John F. Kennedy
Francis Scott Key
Martin Luther King Jr.*
Coretta Scott King
Russell Kirk
Jeane Kirkpatrick
Henry Knox
Tadeusz Kościuszko
Gilbert du Motier, Marquis de Lafayette
Harper Lee
Pierre Charles L'Enfant
Meriwether Lewis
Abraham Lincoln*
Vince Lombardi
Henry Wadsworth Longfellow
Clare Boothe Luce
Douglas MacArthur*
Dolley Madison*
James Madison*
George Marshall
Thurgood Marshall
William Mayo
Christa McAuliffe*
William McKinley
Louise McManus
Herman Melville
Thomas Merton
Billy Mitchell
George P. Mitchell
Maria Mitchell
Samuel Morse
Lucretia Mott
John Muir
Audie Murphy*
Edward R. Murrow
John Neumann
John von Neumann
Annie Oakley
Jesse Owens
Rosa Parks
George S. Patton Jr.*
Charles Willson Peale
William Penn
Oliver Hazard Perry
John J. Pershing
Edgar Allan Poe
Clark V. Poling
John Russell Pope
Elvis Presley
Jeannette Rankin
Ronald Reagan*
Walter Reed
William Rehnquist
Paul Revere
Henry Hobson Richardson
Hyman Rickover
Sally Ride
Matthew Ridgway
Jackie Robinson*
Norman Rockwell
Caesar Rodney
Eleanor Roosevelt
Franklin D. Roosevelt
Theodore Roosevelt
Betsy Ross*
Babe Ruth
Sacagawea
Jonas Salk
John Singer Sargent
Antonin Scalia*
Norman Schwarzkopf
Junípero Serra
Elizabeth Ann Seton
Robert Gould Shaw
Fulton Sheen
Alan Shepard
Frank Sinatra
Bessie Smith
Margaret Chase Smith
Elizabeth Cady Stanton
Jimmy Stewart
Harriet Beecher Stowe*
Gilbert Stuart
Anne Sullivan
William Howard Taft
Maria Tallchief
Maxwell Taylor
Tecumseh
Kateri Tekakwitha
Shirley Temple
Nikola Tesla
Jefferson Thomas
Henry David Thoreau
Jim Thorpe
Augustus Tolton
Alex Trebek
Harry S. Truman
Sojourner Truth
Harriet Tubman*
Mark Twain
Dorothy Vaughan
C. T. Vivian
Thomas Ustick Walter
Sam Walton
John P. Washington
Booker T. Washington*
George Washington*
John Wayne
Ida B. Wells-Barnett
Phillis Wheatley
Walt Whitman
Laura Ingalls Wilder
Roger Williams
John Winthrop
Frank Lloyd Wright
Orville Wright*
Wilbur Wright*
Alvin C. York
Cy Young
Lorenzo de Zavala

See also
1776 Commission
Hall of Fame for Great Americans
National Statuary Hall Collection

References 

Heroes
Proposed monuments and memorials in the United States
Trump administration controversies